USS Curry County (LST-685) was an  built for the United States Navy during World War II. Named after counties in New Mexico and Oregon, she was the only U.S. Naval vessel to bear the name.

LST-685 was laid down on 21 December 1943 at Jeffersonville, Indiana by the Jeffersonville Boat & Machine Company; launched on 18 February 1944; sponsored by Miss Agnes J. Langley; and commissioned on 7 April 1944.

Service history
Following World War II, LST-685 performed occupation duty in the Far East until mid-April 1946. She returned to the United States and was decommissioned on 22 July 1946. On 13 January 1947 the ship was placed in service and used for Naval Reserve training out of Tompkinsville, New York. She was inactivated on 2 June 1950 at Green Cove Springs, Florida. On 1 July 1955 she was redesignated USS Curry County (LST-685). The tank landing ship was struck from the Naval Vessel Register on 1 November 1958.

Sold for commercial purposes (date unknown), the ship was listed in the 1959 issue of La Marina Mercante Argentina edited by the Instituto de Estudios de la Marina Mercante Argentina as Sulmar, owned by Navemar S. A., Argentina, working between Argentine and Brazilian ports. Her final fate is unknown.

References

See also
 List of United States Navy LSTs
 Curry County, New Mexico
 Curry County, Oregon

 

LST-542-class tank landing ships
World War II amphibious warfare vessels of the United States
Cold War amphibious warfare vessels of the United States
Ships built in Jeffersonville, Indiana
Curry County, New Mexico
Curry County, Oregon
1944 ships